Warnakolasooriya Rose Priyanka Fernando (born 28 July 1979) is a Sri Lankan former cricketer who played primarily as a right-arm off break bowler. She appeared in one Test match, 37 One Day Internationals and three Twenty20 Internationals for Sri Lanka women's cricket team between 1997 and 2010. Her sister Hiruka also played cricket for Sri Lanka.

Career
Fernando made her only Women's Test cricket appearance in a 1998 match against Pakistan. She scored 44 runs in the first innings, and took three wickets in the second innings. Fernando played for Sri Lanka at the 2002 Indoor Cricket World Cup. In 2009, she was given a contract by Sri Lanka Cricket. In the same year, Fernando represented Sri Lanka at the 2009 Women's Cricket World Cup. In a World Cup match against England, Fernando was reported for an illegal bowling action, as well as England bowler Jenny Gunn.

References

External links
 
 

1979 births
Living people
People from Puttalam District
Sri Lanka women Test cricketers
Sri Lanka women One Day International cricketers
Sri Lanka women Twenty20 International cricketers
Slimline Sport Club women cricketers
Kurunegala Youth Cricket Club women cricketers
Sri Lanka Air Force Sports Club women cricketers